Walter Wood (January 3, 1914 – January 1972) was an American athlete. He competed in the men's discus throw at the 1936 Summer Olympics.

References

1914 births
1972 deaths
Athletes (track and field) at the 1936 Summer Olympics
American male discus throwers
Olympic track and field athletes of the United States
Place of birth missing